Pangasius myanmar is a species of shark catfish. It is found from Irrawaddy to Salween and in Rangoon.

References

Further reading
Jondeung, Amnuay, Pradit Sangthong, and Rafael Zardoya. "The complete mitochondrial DNA sequence of the Mekong giant catfish (Pangasianodon gigas), and the phylogenetic relationships among Siluriformes." Gene 387.1 (2007): 49–57.
Pouyaud, Laurent, Rudhy Gustiano, and Guy G. Teugels. "Systematic revision of Pangasius polyuranodon (Siluriformes, Pangasiidae) with description of two new species." Cybium 26.4 (2002): 243–252.
Hossain, M. Y., M. M. Rahman, and M. F. A. Mollah. "Threatened fishes of the world: Pangasius pangasius Hamilton-Buchanan, 1822 (Pangasiidae)."Environmental biology of fishes 84.3 (2009): 315–316.

External links

Pangasiidae
Catfish of Asia
Fish of Myanmar
Taxa named by Tyson R. Roberts
Taxa named by Chavalit Vidthayanon
Fish described in 1991